Paul is a village in Cornwall, England, United Kingdom. It is in the civil parish of Penzance. The village is two miles (3 km) south of Penzance and one mile (1.6 km) south of Newlyn.
 
The village of Paul should not be confused with the former civil parish of Paul, which lay to the west of the village and, since 1934 with the reorganisation of local government, does not include the village of Paul.

Like many Cornish communities Paul has its own community celebration. Paul Feast is held on the Sunday nearest 10 October every year when the village is decorated and a civic service takes place on the Sunday of the feast itself led by the Mayor of Penzance.

History
The traditional Cornish name of Paul is Brewinney. Much of the history of Paul is connected with its parish church, St Pol de Léon’s Church which is said to have been founded in 490, a very uncertain date and not documented by Paul (or Paol) Aurelian, a Welsh saint. There is no historical evidence to support that he ever came to West Penwith. He was the founder of the cathedral at Saint-Pol-de-Léon, a commune. However this church may also have been dedicated to Paul the Apostle, or Paulinus of York, there is no evidence to prove any of these three Saint Pauls was the original dedicatee of the church. It was only named 'St. Pol-de-Leon' in 1907 and is probably connected with Henry Jenner who (with W. C. Borlase) opposed alleged 'Englishness' and consistent spelling of Cornish place names on OS maps.

The first documented name for Paul Church comes from the registers of Bishop Bronescombe, when on 2 May 1259 the first recorded priest was installed, as Rector in his own right, in the 'Ecclesie Sancti Paulini'--Church of Saint Paulinus (but either Paulinus of York or Paulinus of Wales could have been intended). However it seems less likely that either of these two saints were intended as Henry III granted a charter in 1266 for a Fair to be held in Paul on 12 March, being the feast of Paul Aurelian. 

Paul and its church have an association with Mousehole as the church has served as Mousehole’s parish church since its inception. Paul was one of the communities along with Mousehole, Newlyn, and Penzance to be destroyed in the Spanish raid of 1595 carried out by Carlos de Amésquita.

Captain Stephen Hutchens (died 1709, Port Royal, Jamaica) bequeathed £500 to the building of almshouses and the maintenance of six poor men and six poor women born in the parish. At the beginning of the 19th century it was found that the almshouses, instead of being administered as bequeathed, were being used as a workhouse for all the poor of the parish. Consequently, a new poor house was built on Trungle Moor.

Cornish language (memorials)

Within the village churchyard there is a memorial to Dolly Pentreath, believed to be the last native speaker of Cornish, although this claim may be disputed. Louis Lucien Bonaparte and the Vicar of Paul opened this memorial in 1860.

The Cornish language writers Nicholas Boson, Thomas Boson and John Boson are all buried in Paul Churchyard, and a monument in the church by John Boson (to Arthur Hutchens, d. 1709) is the only surviving lapidary inscription in traditional Cornish.

Parish
The ancient parish of Paul included Newlyn and Mousehole as well as the village of Paul.  In 1851 Newlyn was separated to form the new ecclesiastical parish of Newlyn St Peter. The ancient parish became a civil parish in 1866, and in 1894 became the Paul Urban District.  The urban district was abolished in 1934.  Newlyn and the villages of Paul and Mousehole were transferred from the civil parish and urban district of Paul to the municipal borough of Penzance, now the civil parish of Penzance.  The western part of the civil parish of Paul remained a separate, smaller parish (which did not include the village of Paul), from 1934 to 1974 in West Penwith Rural District.

In 2020 Cornwall Council announced that the neighbouring parishes of St Buryan and Paul would be abolished on 1 April 2021 with the land amalgamated to form a new parish known as St Buryan, Lamorna and Paul. The new parish has 12 councillors elected for a period of 4 years.

The population of the civil parish (i.e. excluding the village) was 269 in 2011.

Arthur Langdon (1896) recorded the existence of five stone crosses in the parish. One is at Carlankan, one at Halwyn and one at St Paul Down. There are also crosses in the vicarage hedge and on the churchyard wall (the latter has a crude crucifixus figure on one side).

In the north of the former civil parish is Chyenhal Moor, a Site of Special Scientific Interest noted for its biological interest.

Mining
In 1788, Wheal Mary mined an east–west lode (near Drift) which was in both Paul and Sancreed parishes. It later became known as Garth (or Gath) mine. Following a period of idleness operations resumed under the name of East Wheal Cock and work continued to 1843 when the mine was known as Wheal Darby. Over forty years after the mine closed, a capped shaft at Bologas was reported to have collapsed and the mine was referred to as ″Gath mine″ in The Cornishman newspaper. All signs of the mine on the ground had disappeared by 1925, although quantities of ″wood tin″, continued to find their way into Cornish mineral collections.

Governance
The village of Paul is represented on Penzance Town Council. For elections to Cornwall Council (the unitary authority) Paul is within the three-member Penzance Electoral division.

Sport
Paul Cricket Club home is at Hutchens Park Playing Field, Trungle Moor and they play in Division Two West; the third tier of the Cornwall Cricket League. In 2007 the club came second in the Cornwall Cricket League and won the competition in 2010, to become Cornish champions for the only time. Adjacent to the cricket club is Mousehole AFC (established 1923). The first team have played in Division One West of the South West Peninsula League since its inauguration in 2007. Their best season was 2013–14 when they came second.

References

External links

 
 GENUKI website; Paul

Villages in Cornwall
Penwith
Penzance